Taylor Sheridan (born May 21, 1970) is an American filmmaker and actor. Sheridan portrayed David Hale in the FX television series Sons of Anarchy and Danny Boyd in Veronica Mars (2005–2007).

Sheridan has written several films, including the screenplay for Sicario (2015), for which he was nominated for the Writers Guild of America Award for Best Original Screenplay. He was nominated for the Academy Award for Best Original Screenplay for Hell or High Water (2016), which was nominated for three other Oscars, including Best Picture. Sheridan also wrote and directed the 2017 neo-Western crime film Wind River and wrote the 2018 sequel to Sicario. He is a co-creator of the Paramount Network television series Yellowstone and creator of its prequels 1883 (2021) and 1923 (2022), and he co-created the crime thriller Mayor of Kingstown. He also created the crime drama Tulsa King, which he co-writes and showruns with Terence Winter.

In 2021, Sheridan was inducted into the Texas Cowboy Hall of Fame.

Early life
Sheridan was born in Chapel Hill, North Carolina. Several news articles have reported that he grew up on a ranch in Cranfills Gap, Texas, but he was raised in Fort Worth, Texas, the son of a cardiologist.  His cowboy identity comes from his mother, who was originally from Waco and loved visiting her grandparents' ranch in that area.  When Sheridan was eight years old, his mother insisted on buying a ranch in Cranfills Gap so that her children would "learn firsthand about the peaceful feeling of freedom in nature".  Sheridan learned how to be a cowboy during his family's frequent visits to the Cranfills Gap ranch when he was growing up in the late 1980s.  Meanwhile, he attended and graduated from R. L. Paschal High School, where he was "the rare weekend wrangler who was also a theater kid".

After Sheridan dropped out of Texas State University, he moved to Austin, where he mowed lawns and painted houses. While looking for jobs in a shopping mall, Sheridan met a talent scout, who offered him the chance to go to Chicago and pursue an acting career. He later lived in New York City and Los Angeles during his time as an actor.

Career
Sheridan began his career in acting, appearing in small films and in recurring roles in television series like Veronica Mars, Walker, Texas Ranger and most notably, as David Hale in Sons of Anarchy. He made the transition into screenwriting after he turned 40. His first film as a screenwriter was Sicario, directed by Denis Villeneuve. It revolves around Kate Macer (Emily Blunt), an FBI agent who is enlisted to a government task force to bring down the leader of a powerful and brutal Mexican drug cartel. It also starred Josh Brolin and Benicio del Toro. The film received critical acclaim, with a 94% approval rating on Rotten Tomatoes, and received a number of nominations, including a Writers Guild of America Award nomination for Best Original Screenplay for Sheridan.

Sheridan wrote Comancheria after Sicario. Comancheria sold first but was stuck in development for quite a few years, appearing on the Black List in 2012. It was later retitled Hell or High Water and was released in August 2016, starring Jeff Bridges, Chris Pine and Ben Foster, and again received critical acclaim. For his screenplay, Sheridan received a large amount of awards attention, earning BAFTA, Golden Globe Award, and Academy Award nominations.

The low-budget horror film Vile is credited as Sheridan's first film, but he does not consider the film his directorial debut, stating in a 2017 Rotten Tomatoes interview:

His second feature as director, but third as screenwriter, Wind River, starring Jeremy Renner and Elizabeth Olsen, premiered at Sundance Film Festival in January 2017. The film follows an FBI agent (Olsen) and a veteran game tracker (Renner), investigating a murder that occurred on a Native American reservation. The Weinstein Company had acquired the distribution rights during the 2016 Cannes Film Festival, but dropped the film prior to the Sundance premiere. However, the company later finalized its deal to distribute it. Wind River was widely released in the United States on August 18, 2017, following a brief limited release. Following Sicario and Hell or High Water, Wind River is the third installment of Sheridan's trilogy of "the modern-day American frontier".

On September 15, 2016, Deadline reported that Sheridan had been set by Sony Pictures and Escape Artists to script the American remake of the Matthias Schoenaerts drama-thriller film Disorder, a 2015 French film directed by Alice Winocour. Escape Artists' Todd Black, Jason Blumenthal, Steve Tisch and Tony Shaw were scheduled to produce the remake and David Beaubaire to oversee it for the studio. James Mangold was going to direct.

In 2017, Sheridan created the television series Yellowstone starring Kevin Costner that has aired on the Paramount Network for five seasons running beginning June 20, 2018.   

Sheridan wrote the sequel to Sicario, titled Sicario: Day of the Soldado, which was directed by Stefano Sollima and released in 2018. More recently, his overall deal with ViacomCBS was renewed.

In May 2019, it was announced Warner Bros. Pictures and New Line Cinema acquired distribution rights to the film Those Who Wish Me Dead with Sheridan as director. The film had a theatrical debut internationally in South Korea on May 5, 2021. In the United States, it was released on May 14, 2021.

Style 
As an actor, Sheridan has explained that the amount of expositional dialogue he read for television caused him to form an "allergy to exposition" in his writing. He has also said that he looks for "absurdly simple" plots in order to focus solely on character. He has cited the Coen brothers, Cormac McCarthy, and Larry McMurtry as influential to his writing.

He is known for toying with the form and structure of a screenplay in his work. In Sicario, Sheridan incorporated a "five-act structure and a five-act structure within that." He believes in the intelligence of the audience, and uses the structure and context of his stories as a way to subvert expectations: "I look at each movie as, 'How am I breaking the rules this time?'"

Personal life 
Sheridan has been married to actress and model Nicole Muirbrook since 2013. The pair have a son.  They currently reside in Weatherford, Texas.

Filmography

Film

Television

Acting

Notes

References

External links
 

1970 births
Living people
20th-century American male actors
21st-century American male actors
21st-century American male writers
21st-century American screenwriters
American male film actors
American male screenwriters
American male television actors
American male television writers
American television directors
American television writers
Film directors from Texas
Film producers from Texas
Male actors from Texas
People from Bosque County, Texas
People from Chapel Hill, North Carolina
Screenwriters from Texas
Showrunners
Television producers from Texas